Thomas Crane Wales (June 23, 1952 – October 12, 2001) was an American federal prosecutor and gun control advocate who was the victim of an unsolved murder. In 2018, FBI investigators announced they strongly suspected the killing to have been carried out by a paid hitman.

Early life and education 
Thomas Wales was born in Boston, Massachusetts. He was a graduate of Milton Academy, where he roomed with Joseph Patrick Kennedy II, the son of Robert F. Kennedy. Wales graduated from Harvard University and the Maurice A. Deane School of Law, where he graduated with distinction in 1979 and served as the Editor-in-Chief of the Hofstra Law Review.

Career 
In 1995, a student at the high school that Wales' son attended brought a gun to school and shot and injured two classmates. Soon after, Wales became involved in Washington CeaseFire, most visibly as a vocal supporter of an unsuccessful 1997 state referendum that would have required gun owners to use trigger locks. Wales later became president of CeaseFire. As a community volunteer, he was active in civic organizations and served as a trustee of the Federal Bar Association.

Wales worked as an Assistant U.S. Attorney at the United States District Court for the Western District of Washington in Seattle, specializing in the investigation and prosecution of fraud in banking and business.

Assassination 
On the evening of Thursday, October 11, 2001, at approximately 10:40 p.m., Wales was sitting at his computer in his home office in his basement. A gunman avoided the security lights in Wales' backyard and shot him in the neck, through a window, with a handgun. The killer left shell casings behind. The shots were heard by a neighbor who called 9-1-1. It has been reported that a lone male suspect was seen fleeing the scene. 

Wales died at a hospital the next day. He is believed to be the only U.S. federal prosecutor in history to have been victim of an assassination.

Murder investigation

Following the murder, the federal government offered a $1 million reward for information "leading to the arrest and conviction of the person or persons responsible" for Wales' murder. As of 2018, however, the case remained unsolved and no evidence has been found to establish a motive. An airplane pilot living in Bellevue, a firearms enthusiast who Wales had prosecuted, was investigated and his home searched, but he was not charged. Agents believed he resented Wales' off-duty activism as a leading gun-control advocate. The pilot later filed a malicious prosecution claim but the suit was dismissed.

In early 2003 Scott Lee Kimball, later found to be a serial killer, was working as an FBI informant. He had told agents that a former cellmate of his when he had been in federal detention awaiting trial in Alaska had confessed to having killed Wales. But when he was given the chance to meet with the man, by then released as well, Kimball failed to steer the conversation toward the crime in the way the agents had coached him and seemed, in fact, to barely be acquainted with the man. Kimball failed a lie detector test administered afterwards, and agents suspected he had fabricated the account even as he continued to insist he had not.

It has been suggested by the media that U.S Attorney John McKay was dismissed in part due to his request that resource allocation for the Wales investigation remain high. 

In June 2007, the FBI cut the staff assigned to the case down to two.

In February 2018, an FBI official reported the investigation had found "evidence strongly suggesting" Wales was murdered by a contract killer and, for the first time, indicated that his death was likely a conspiracy involving a small group of people. The United States Department of Justice, meanwhile, announced that then-Deputy Attorney General Rod Rosenstein would arrive in Seattle on Wednesday, February 21, 2018, to brief media on the progress of the 16-year-old investigation.

First in 2011 and then in 2018, the FBI released footage of Wales's grown children requesting tips and publicizing the $1 million reward.

Legacy 
In his memory, the Thomas C. Wales Foundation was established to support civic engagement, and Thomas C. Wales Park in Seattle was dedicated in 2011.

See also 
 Jonathan Luna
 List of Harvard University people
 List of unsolved murders

References

External links
 Somebody Somewhere, a podcast investigation of Wales' murder

1952 births
2001 deaths
2001 murders in the United States
American murder victims
Assistant United States Attorneys
Deaths by firearm in Washington (state)
Dismissal of U.S. attorneys controversy
American gun control activists
Harvard University alumni
Maurice A. Deane School of Law alumni
Milton Academy alumni
Assassinated lawyers
Lawyers from Boston
People murdered in Washington (state)
Unsolved murders in the United States